Jason Douglas Middlebrook (born June 26, 1975) is a retired professional baseball pitcher. He played parts of three seasons in Major League Baseball, from 2001 to 2003, for the San Diego Padres and New York Mets.

On July 31, 2002, Middlebrook and Steve Reed were traded to the New York Mets in exchange for Jason Bay, Bobby Jones and Josh Reynolds.

References

External links

Major League Baseball pitchers
San Diego Padres players
New York Mets players
Clinton LumberKings players
Rancho Cucamonga Quakes players
Arizona League Padres players
Mobile BayBears players
Las Vegas Stars (baseball) players
Portland Beavers players
Norfolk Tides players
Salt Lake Stingers players
Baseball players from Michigan
1975 births
Living people
Stanford Cardinal baseball players